Thijs Zonneveld (born 28 September 1980 in Leiden) is a Dutch journalist and a cyclist, who currently rides for UCI Continental team .

Major results
2004
 6th Scandinavian Open Road Race
 6th 
2005
 1st Stage 3 Volta Ciclista Internacional a Lleida
 9th La Roue Tourangelle
2007
 4th Rund um Düren

References

External links

1980 births
Living people
Dutch male cyclists
Sportspeople from Leiden
Cyclists from South Holland
20th-century Dutch people
21st-century Dutch people